Tierra Firme may refer to:
 Province of Tierra Firme, 16th century Spanish colony
 Tierra Firme (album), a 2011 album by Puerto Rican singer-songwriter Luis Fonsi
 Tierra Firme F.C., a Panamanian football team
 Santa Fe de Tierra Firme, a fictional country of Hispanic America in:
 Ramón María del Valle-Inclán's 1926 novel 
 its 1993 film adaptation Banderas, the Tyrant

See also
 Terra firma (disambiguation)